Larrabee may refer to:

Places in the United States
 Larrabee, California, a former name of Larabee 
 Larrabee, Iowa, a city in Cherokee County
 Larrabees, New Jersey, a community in Monmouth County
 Larrabee, Wisconsin, a town in Waupaca County
 Larrabee (community), Wisconsin, an unincorporated community in Manitowoc County
 Larrabee State Park, a park in Whatcom County, Washington

Other uses
 Larrabee (surname)
 Larrabee (microarchitecture), a former codename for an Intel microarchitecture

See also
 Larabee (disambiguation)
 Larabie (disambiguation)